New Munster is an unincorporated community and census-designated place in the town of Wheatland, in Kenosha County, Wisconsin, United States. The ZIP Code is 53152. It was named a CDP prior to the 2020 census, which showed a population of 286.

Demographics

2020 census

Note: the US Census treats Hispanic/Latino as an ethnic category. This table excludes Latinos from the racial categories and assigns them to a separate category. Hispanics/Latinos can be of any race.

Notes

Unincorporated communities in Wisconsin
Unincorporated communities in Kenosha County, Wisconsin
Census-designated places in Wisconsin
Census-designated places in Kenosha County, Wisconsin